Landscape with Cows and Camel (German: Landschaft mit Kühen und Kamel) is a 1914 color on canvas painting by German Expressionist painter August Macke. It is drawn in a Expressionist style influenced by Orphism. It is now housed at Kunsthaus Zürich, Zürich.

See also
List of works by August Macke
Der Blaue Reiter
Expressionism

Notes

References

External links

1914 paintings
Paintings by August Macke
Camels in art
Cattle in art